Dress Me Up! is an album by Denise Ho, released on December 19, 2003.

Track listing
懶 (Lazy)
忘 (Forget)
我是芭比 (I Am Barbie)
沙 (Sand)
娃鬼回魂 (Return of the Ghost Doll)
迪裡斯的婚禮 (Denise's Wedding Ceremony)
兩位一體 (Two Becomes One)
元神出竅 (Spirit Leaves)
無家可歸 (Homeless)
出生入死 (Through Heaven And Hell)
鬼 (Ghost) (Hidden Track)

External links
 HOCC WEB! Dress Me Up!

Denise Ho albums
2003 albums